Filiberto Manzo (29 April 1930 – 20 May 1996) was a Mexican basketball player. He competed in the men's tournament at the 1952 Summer Olympics.

References

1930 births
1996 deaths
Mexican men's basketball players
Olympic basketball players of Mexico
Basketball players at the 1952 Summer Olympics
Place of birth missing